Cheung Po Chun (born 11 May 1971 in Hong Kong) is a Hong Kong former professional footballer and current coach at Hong Kong Women League club Kitchee Women Football team.

Career 

Cheung Po Chun was a goalkeeper when he was a footballer. He spent his youth career at numbers of clubs.

In 1990, Cheung Po Chun was playing at Sing Tao. He was promoted to the first team from the youth team. However, he didn't have too much chances after being promoted to the first team.

In April 1991, he was selected to represent the Hong Kong U-21 team as a third choice goalkeeper. Chung Ho Yin and Lee Chun Fat was the first and second choice.

In 1992, as he wanted to get first team chances, he decided to transfer to Michelotti. However, he had only played Michelotti for 2 games.

In 1993, he chose to become a police. During his police career, he represented Police football team.

Coaching career 

In the 2008–09 season, he was selected to be the head coach of Tai Po. He helped the team to win the Hong Kong FA Cup and qualified for the 2009 AFC Cup in the first season.

On 6 June 2020, Cheung was announced as a fitness coach for Pegasus.

References 

1971 births
Living people
Hong Kong footballers
Hong Kong First Division League players
Hong Kong football managers
South China AA managers
Association football goalkeepers